Pseudomonas resinovorans is a Gram-negative, soil bacterium that is commonly found in the lubricating oils of wood mills. It is able to degrade carbazole, and as such, may be used in bioremediation. Based on 16S rRNA analysis, P. resinovorans has been placed in the P. aeruginosa group.

References

External links
Type strain of Pseudomonas resinovorans at BacDive -  the Bacterial Diversity Metadatabase

Pseudomonadales
Bacteria described in 1961